Appie is a masculine given name or nickname which may refer to:

 John S. Apperson (1878–1963), American engineer and environmentalist
 A. C. Baantjer (1923–2010), Dutch author of detective fiction and police officer
 Abraham Bueno de Mesquita (1918–2005), Dutch comedian and actor
 Abdelhali Chaiat (born 1983), Moroccan footballer
 Appie Corman, a Dutch competitor in boxing at the 1948 Summer Olympics – Men's flyweight class
 Appie de Gelder, guitarist of the Dutch heavy metal band Picture (band)
 Abdelhak Nouri (born 1997), Dutch footballer
 Appie Rammers, a member of the 1960s Dutch band The Outsiders (Dutch band)
 Appie Steenbeek, a Dutch competitor in the 1985 Mr. Olympia contest
 Appie Tayibi, one of the main characters in the Belgian-Dutch television series Het Huis Anubis

Masculine given names
Lists of people by nickname